Fernando dos Santos Pedro (born 1 March 1999), commonly known as Fernando, is a Brazilian footballer who plays as a forward for Red Bull Salzburg.

Career

Club
On 21 April 2022, Red Bull Salzburg announced the signing of Fernando from Shakhtar Donetsk on a contract until 30 June 2027, with the Brazilian joining the club to train before the transfer takes affect at the end of the 2021–22.

Career statistics

Club

Honours

Club
Shakhtar Donetsk
Ukrainian Premier League: 2018–19, 2019–20
Ukrainian Cup: 2018–19
Ukrainian Super Cup: 2021

References

External links
 

1999 births
Living people
Brazilian footballers
Association football forwards
Campeonato Brasileiro Série A players
Sociedade Esportiva Palmeiras players
FC Shakhtar Donetsk players
Sporting CP footballers
FC Red Bull Salzburg players
Ukrainian Premier League players
Brazilian expatriate footballers
Expatriate footballers in Ukraine
Expatriate footballers in Portugal
Expatriate footballers in Austria
Brazilian expatriate sportspeople in Ukraine
Brazilian expatriate sportspeople in Portugal
Brazilian expatriate sportspeople in Austria
Footballers from Belo Horizonte